Michael Stolle (born 17 December 1974 in Buxtehude) is a German pole vaulter.

His personal best was 5.95 metres, achieved in August 2000 in Monaco. This ranks him third among German pole vaulters, only behind Tim Lobinger and Andrei Tivontchik.

Competition record

References

1974 births
Living people
German male pole vaulters
Olympic athletes of Germany
Athletes (track and field) at the 1996 Summer Olympics
Athletes (track and field) at the 2000 Summer Olympics
People from Buxtehude
Sportspeople from Lower Saxony